Karl-Åke Asph (born 2 February 1939) is a Swedish cross-country skier who competed during the 1960s. He won a gold medal in the 4 × 10 km relay at the 1964 Winter Olympics in Innsbruck. He was born in Avesta.

Cross-country skiing results

Olympic Games
 1 medal – (1 gold)

External links
Database Olympics profile

1939 births
Living people
People from Avesta Municipality
Cross-country skiers at the 1964 Winter Olympics
Swedish male cross-country skiers
Olympic medalists in cross-country skiing
Medalists at the 1964 Winter Olympics
Olympic gold medalists for Sweden